Cathorops taylori, the Taylor's sea catfish, is a species of sea catfish. It is found in estuaries at depths below 20 m from Mexico to El Salvador in the Eastern Pacific. Maximum recorded body length is 28.3 cm.

References

Ariidae
Fish described in 1925
Taxa named by Samuel Frederick Hildebrand